

T-Ray

Tag

Tai

Hiro Takachiho

Glenn Talbot

Talisman

Talon

Talon is depicted as a feline Inhuman in the Earth-691 timeline of the fictional Marvel Universe, sorcerer apprentice to Krugarr. Talon debuted in Guardians of the Galaxy #18 (November 1991). He is a member of the Guardians of the Galaxy.  Initially, creator Jim Valentino wanted to use Wolverine in a storyline where the Guardians had briefly returned to Earth, but Bob Harras, the X-Men editor of the time, did not want it established that Wolverine could live that long. Thus, Valentino created Talon, influenced by Steve Englehart's take on the Beast during Beast's "party hearty" time with the Avengers. Valentino later stated that Talon "wasn't gay, as some people thought. I thought it would lighten things up to have a happy-go-lucky screw-up on the team since, when looked at properly, the Guardians were not a superhero team, but rather a light army."

Talon has some superhuman abilities thanks to his genetically superior Inhuman physiology, and has possibly been exposed to the mutagenic Terrigen Mist. He has a feline form: an orange fur-covered body, razor-sharp talons on his hands and feet, pointed ears, pronounced canine teeth, and a 3' prehensile tail. He has superhuman strength, is an Olympic-level acrobat and gymnast, and is a highly skilled hand-to-hand combatant. The talons on his hands and feet can be detached and hurled as weapons, then regrow instantly.

Talos the Untamed

Tangerine 
Tangerine is a fictional character appearing in American comic books published by Marvel Comics. She appears in two separate future timelines, and in the present day as a member of MI-13.

Tara
Tara the Girlchild is a fictional character appearing in American comic books published by Marvel Comics. Created by Mike Friedrich and Paul Gulacy, she first appeared in Adventures into Fear #20 (November 1973). She was a genetically-engineered psychic vampire who had the ability to use an older avatar of herself with superhuman abilities. Tara was used as a weapon for Reverend Daemond and the Caretakers of Arcturus IV, but battled with Morbius, the Living Vampire against her creators before dying from the ensuing confrontation.

Tarantula

Anton Miguel Rodriguez

Luis Alvarez

Unnamed

Jacinda Rodriguez

Maria Vasquez

Kaine Parker

Tarot

Tarot (Marie-Ange Colbert) first appeared in The New Mutants #16 (June 1984) and was created by Chris Claremont and Sal Buscema. Tarot is able to generate animated constructs composed of tangible psionic energy based on the two-dimensional figures on the tarot cards she carried. She can create multiple human-sized figures and even massive flying constructs without any apparent strain. Tarot's psionic constructs are superhumanly strong and durable, resistant to physical damage, temperature extremes, and certain forms of energy. They are completely under her mental control and will dissipate on her command. Tarot is a member of the original Hellions.

Tarzan

Taserface

Taskmaster

Tatterdemalion
Tatterdemalion (Arnold Paffenroth) is a supervillain with gloves coated with a chemical solution that dissolves paper products, such as dollar bills. Created by Tom Sutton, the character first appeared in Werewolf by Night #9 (September 1973).

Tatterdemalion had been a wealthy business investor until the Las Vegas mob swindled him out of his money, which led to him becoming an insane homeless person. With an army of derelicts hired by Sidney Sarnak on behalf of the Committee, he battles the Werewolf. The Committee outfits Paffenroth with a sophisticated costume and equipment, which he uses to sneak up on unsuspecting victims and destroy their money. He battles the Werewolf and the superhero Spider-Man.

Tatterdemalion later joins the Night Shift, a group of villains tricked by the Shroud into doing good. He and Captain America battle the Power Broker and his augmented mutates. He remains with the Night Shift for some time. In the Civil War storyline, Tatterdemalion was among the supervillains who were apprehended and given a choice between jail or assisting the Thunderbolts.

Other versions of Tatterdemalion
In Marvel Zombies, Tatterdemalion and other members of the Night Shift appear as part of the Hood's gang. They are killed when the zombie virus mutates and becomes airborne. The virus cloud begins to rain blood, and reanimates the Night Shift as zombies. Dormammu assumes control of the Night Shift and uses them to fight the Midnight Sons. When Jennifer Kale and the Black Talon contain the virus within the Zombie (Simon Garth), the Night Shift members, still in an undead state, cease their rampage. The Hood teleports away with them.

Tatterdemalion in other media
Tatterdemalion makes a brief appearance in the M.O.D.O.K. animated television series episode "This Man... This Makeover!", voiced by Jonathan Kite. This version is an actual homeless man who claims to have been a victim of the dot com crash. While he has not shown any villainous dealings, Wonder Man considers him a threat and has no qualms about beating up Tatterdemalion in public.

Tattoo
Tattoo, also known as Longstrike, is a mutant, a student of the Xavier Institute. Created by Grant Morrison and Frank Quitely, the character first appeared in New X-Men #126. She can display messages or designs on her skin, as well as phase through solid matter.

She is one of the many students who were mentally controlled by Cassandra Nova to attack Wolverine and Beast. Tattoo and the other students are freed from Cassandra's influence by the Stepford Cuckoos. She is romantically involved with another student named Slick, but later breaks up with him when she discovers his true appearance.

Tattoo joins the Omega Gang, led by Quentin Quire, which includes her brother Radian. They set out to avenge what seems to be the murder of Jumbo Carnation, a popular mutant clothes designer. They also attack and kill a group of murderous, mutant-hunting U-Men. The Omega Gang starts a riot at Xavier Institute during 'Opening Day' celebrations, an event designed to bring the public to Xavier's. Several members, including Tattoo, confront the X-Men on the front lawn. During the battle Tattoo manages to phase her hand into Cyclops's head. She informs him if she became solid, he would die. Emma Frost turns into her diamond form and places her hand inside of Tattoo's head; now Tattoo would also die if she became solid. This eliminates the stand-off. After the Omega Gang is neutralized, all but Quire are sentenced to jail.

Tattoo is one of many mutants that lose their superhuman powers after M-Day.

After being released from jail, she joins the New Warriors under the codename Longstrike, using a version of Stilt-Man's armor since she no longer has her abilities. However, she is killed on one of the team's first missions.

Taurus

Cornelius Van Lunt

Android

Ecliptic

Unnamed

Orwell Taylor
General Orwell Taylor is a character in Marvel Comics. The character, created by David Michelinie and Mark Bagley, first appeared in Venom: Lethal Protector #1 (February 1993). He is the founder of The Jury.

The father of Maxwell (Max) Taylor and Hugh Taylor, his oldest son was a guard at a prison for super powered criminals who was murdered during Venom's escape. Orwell recruited a number of Hugh's co-workers (Sentry, Firearm, Bomblast) as well as Ramshot (Samuel Culkin) and his youngest son as Screech. Orwell outfitted his group with altered Guardsman armors to hunt Eddie Brock.

Although the Jury failed against Venom, Orwell devised a way to kidnap Spider-Man to be put on trial for bringing the Venom symbiote to Earth. The Jury and Orwell are again met with defeat.

Orwell later began a business relationship with the Life Foundation with The Jury now glorified bodyguards for people in the organization's bunkers. Orwell soon became paranoid that his men were out to usurp his authority. Orwell slowly began to show that his hate and desire for revenge had twisted him and he had no regard left for anyone but himself. A shareholder of the Life Foundation, he and Roland Treece were arrested by federal agents for their part in Carlton Drake's Arachnis Project; the Jury parted from Taylor and redefined their modus operandi.

Orwell most often clashed with his younger son due to Orwell's methods. He also routinely clashed with Ramshot whose conscience kept interfering with Orwell's way of running the Jury. Maxwell abandoned the Screech identity to serve as a defense attorney for the Jury's victims, and Wysper took his son's place. Screech apparently has severed all ties with the Jury just like his father, and was not on the Jury when the group reformed by the U.S. Agent and Edwin Cord.

Taxi Taylor

Jim "Taxi" Taylor is a Marvel Comics adventurer who made his debut in Mystic Comics #2 (April 1940). He drove a submersible flying machine called the Wonder Car and stabbed enemy agents from "Swastikaland" as part of a day's work as a taxi driver. Taylor was created by an unknown creative team for Harry "A" Chesler Studios.  The Taxi Taylor feature did not appear again, but he appeared in the Golden Age revival series, All-Winners Squad: Band of Heroes and with Howard the Duck and Spider-Man.

Tazza

Teen Abomination

Teena the Fat Lady
Mary Stensen is an American sideshow performer. She works for the criminal organization, the Circus of Crime. She left the Circus for a time in the hope of marrying and raising a family, but eventually returned. She is more agile than she appears, and she can use her bulk as a weapon against opponents.

Tefral the Surveyor

Tempest

Claire Temple

Tempo

Tempus

Servant of Immortus
Tempus is an enormous humanoid who dwells in Limbo and serves Immortus. Created by Gerry Conway and John Buscema, the character first appeared in Giant-Size Fantastic Four #2. He has fought many heroes on his master's behalf, including the Fantastic Four, the West Coast Avengers, and Thor. He appeared in the limited series Avengers Forever, attempting to kill Rick Jones and later fighting Hawkeye.

Eva Bell
Eva Bell is a teenage Australian mutant with the ability to create time-freezing bubbles and transport people into the future. When her powers manifest, Cyclops asks her to join his new X-Men. At first she declines, wanting to live a normal life, but then the Avengers come to recruit her and she decides a normal life isn't possible and that Cyclops's team will be cooler. She then creates a time bubble that freezes the Avengers so they can escape. She later becomes a member of The Five.

Temugin
Temugin is the son of the Mandarin. Created by Ryan Odagawa and Mike Grell, he first appeared in Iron Man (vol. 3) #53 (June 2002). The character is named after Genghis Khan, his in-universe ancestor.

As an infant, Temugin was delivered to a monastery in the Himalayas by his father. Confident the monks would educate the boy, the Mandarin cut off almost all communication with his son, which left Temugin with abandonment issues.

He appears in the miniseries Iron Man: Enter the Mandarin, where the Mandarin uses his mind control ring to force Temugin to kill Tony Stark. Temugin later shoots Stark in the chest, and deduces that the man's secret when the suit's chestplate stops the bullet. Temugin escapes and returns to the monastery, and a disappointed Mandarin wipes his mind of the incident.

After the Mandarin's death in a battle against Iron Man, Temugin receives his father's 10 rings of power and discovers that, for honor's sake, he must kill Iron Man so his father's spirit can find peace. Luring Iron Man to his father's fortress, Temugin proves more than a match for Iron Man's mechanically enhanced strength. Before he could kill the hero, another enemy of the Mandarin attacks and the fortress erupts into flames.

Temugin later appears in MODOK's 11 #4, wherein he has been contacted by the double-crossing Spot, who promptly hands over the weapon that MODOK had been planning to steal. In this appearance, Temugin speaks of the Mandarin as "my late father" and bears the rings, one of which he uses to imprison Spot in another dimension with nothing but money. In the following issue, the Puma tears off at least one of his hands. However, it is possible that he retained at least half of the rings, as Nightshade who used the rings on his lost hand, was not seen with them at the end of the story.

However, much later he is seen among the Agents of Atlas, appointed as a second in command, and possible replacement, for Jimmy Woo, current head figure for the Atlas Foundation. Now sporting a bulky prosthetic, he initially comes into conflict with Jimmy Woo over what he perceives as cowardly behavior and pointlessly complicated planning on Woo's part. The two gradually become friends over the course of several battles, most notably versus Jade Claw.

Sasha Hammer is his paternal half-sister.

Temugin in other media

Television
 Temugin (also known as Gene Khan) appears as the Mandarin in Iron Man: Armored Adventures, voiced by Vincent Tong. The last descendant of the first Mandarin, he is searching for his rings so he can gain ultimate power.

Tenebrous

Terminus 
Terminus is an extraterrestrial supervillain. The character, created by John Byrne, first appeared in Fantastic Four #269 (August 1984). Within the context of the Marvel Comics universe, Terminus is a destroyer of worlds, first encountered by Mister Fantastic and the She-Hulk while they investigated a powerful beam from outer space. The beam is Terminus, claiming Earth as his. Mister Fantastic defeats him with a device that drives him hundreds of miles into the crust of the planet.

Terminus in other media
Terminus appears in the series finale of Fantastic Four: World's Greatest Heroes, voiced by Lee Tockar.

Terraformer

Terrax

Terror

The Terror
The Terror debuted in Mystic Comics #5, a publication of Marvel Comics' 1940s predecessor, Timely Comics. The man who became the Terror was horribly injured in an automobile accident after his car crashed into a tree. Dr. John Storm, a reclusive scientist, found his body. Previously, the doctor had come under attack by a rogue gorilla. During the incident, a formula had spilled into the food belonging to the doctor's dog. The dog consumed some of the food and became a wolf-like monster with a skull-face and a thirst for blood. The gorilla was swiftly defeated. Storm theorized that the formula gave entities what they needed in times of extreme need, as when humans are able to lift cars off of trapped love ones. He decided to test the formula on the man he had rescued, who becomes the hero called the Terror.

Terror Inc.

TESS-One
TESS-One (Total Elimination of the Super Soldiers) is a robot. Near the end of 1945, the United States government started to foresee the destructive potential of super heroes like Captain America and the Invaders. They grew concerned that, after World War II, they would not be able to control these powerful new beings. Deep in a secret lab, an unnamed government branch developed TESS-One, a sort of primitive version of the "Sentinel" programs. Through the course of one of Captain America's adventures in the early 1980s, he uncovered the TESS program and made an uneasy alliance with Wolverine to defeat it. The robot was defeated when Captain America and Wolverine cut off her head. TESS-One was a large, autonomous robot that could fire powerful energy blasts. TESS-One also used machine-guns, but quickly ran out of ammunition. During its first appearance, it stormed a lab and upgraded its chassis with a coating of adamantium, making it much harder to defeat.

Texas Twister

Tess Black

Tess Black is a demigoddess, created by J. Michael Straczynski and John Romita Jr., who first appeared in Amazing Spider-Man #503. She is the daughter of a mortal woman and the Asgardian god of mischief, Loki. She was once possessed by the ancient Sorceress of Chaos, Morwen, but Loki and Spider-Man helped her escape from the possession

Thane

Thane is the illegitimate child of Thanos and an unnamed Inhuman woman. He was created by Jonathan Hickman and Mike Deodato and first appeared in New Avengers (vol. 3) #10.

During the Infinity storyline, Thanos begins invading Attilan in an attempt to find and kill his son. Upon undergoing Terrigenesis, Thane develops powers of instant death to those near him and the ability to encase others in amber, but he cannot control these powers and inadvertently kills everyone in his hometown. He is given a special suit by Ebony Maw that allows him to properly control and channel his powers, and he begins to rebel against his father. Thane is easily manipulated, having been used by villains such as J'son and Death in pursuit of their own goals. He is briefly empowered by both The Black Vortex and the Phoenix Force, but is later stripped of all his powers and trapped by Thanos in the God Quarry.

 In other media
 Thane has appeared in Marvel Avengers Academy.
 Thane appears in Marvel Ultimate Alliance 3: The Black Order, voiced by Robbie Daymond. He started out as an ally prior to unwillingly assisting his father in searching for the Infinity Stones, first appearing at Attilan before joining the heroes, then becoming the final boss when the Infinity Stones completely corrupt him. Thane gives himself and the Infinity Stones over to the Black Order to ensure the heroes' safety. However, the Black Order has an idea by sending the heroes to be doomed by Hela and Surtur before waging war with Nova Corps at Knowhere. The heroes and the Black Order prepare to clash, but are stopped by Thane using the Time Stone. Thane wanted both heroes and Black Order allied together alongside him to defeat Thanos, but Thane is distracted trying to choose a side, and remembering Captain America's word that he is not like Thanos. Thanos attacks Thane from behind and confirms to his son that he won't be like him, thus places the Stones in his Infinity Gauntlet, transporting everyone to his throne for a final battle. By the time the heroes defeated Thanos, Thane, now completely corrupted by the Infinity Stones' influence takes the Infinity Gauntlet from him, and uses the stones’ power to don the full armored Infinity Armor while planning to kill his father to prove his superiority and the heroes if they stand in his way. Thane brought the heroes and Thanos with him into the Heart of Infinity, where the Infinity Stones were forged at the center of the universe. The heroes aid Thanos in stopping the out-of-control Thane. Thanos confirms that the power of the Infinity Armor is too great for any mortal being, even Thanos himself, the heroes beg Thanos to save him and Thanos eventually acknowledges Thane as his son and proceeds to pull the Infinity Gauntlet from Thane's hand, causing the two to disappear and leaving the heroes and the Infinity Stones behind upon returning to Thanos’ throne. Unfortunately, the final suicidal clash between him and Thanos somehow awakened a dangerous entity that will invade the universe, alerting both Doctor Doom and Fantastic Four's Mister Fantastic, causing the alliance band back together with Doom and the Fantastic Four on their side.

Reception
In 2021, CBR.com ranked Thane 4th in their "15 Most Powerful Eternals" list.

Thanos

Thena

Eternals

Asgardian
Thena is a member of the Asgardian race in MC2, a possible future of the main Marvel continuity. She first appeared in Avengers Next #2 (November 2006). She is the daughter of the Avenger and god of Thunder, Thor.

In her first comic book appearance, Thena is attacked in error by heroes Nova and Earth Sentry as soon as she lands on Earth. In a fit of rage she battled the A-Next team to a standstill until stunned by a power-blast from Katherine Power.

Thena joins the team on their mission to rescue Kevin Masterson, not realizing that it was a trap created by Sylene, the daughter of Loki, as a way to use their powers to transform Earth into a newer version of Asgard. Although Thena and J2 are used as sacrifices for the spell, they manage to free themselves. Thena (under her father's orders) restores Kevin's powers, allowing him to become Thunderstrike.

As an Asgardian, Thena benefits from superior strength, durability and an extended lifespan when compared with normal humans. Additionally, she has similar powers to her father's, enabling her to control lightning.

Therak

Thermite

Earth-712

Earth-616

Thin Man

Thing

Thog

Thor

Thor Odinson

Roger "Red" Norvell

Jane Foster

Thor Girl

Thorn 
Thorn (Salvatore "Sal" Carbone) is a fictional character, primarily an enemy of the Punisher, created by writer Chuck Dixon and artist John Romita Jr. The character first appeared in The Punisher War Zone #1 (March 1992).

Wanting to eliminate the Carbones, a crime family situated in Brooklyn, the Punisher infiltrated the group with the aid of a petty criminal named Mickey Fondozzi. The Carbones were led by Julius, whose second in-command was his brother, Salvatore. While Julius welcomed Mickey and the Punisher (who had adopted the alias "Johnny Tower") into the organization, Sal disliked the two, and was suspicious of their motives, correctly assuming that they were sabotaging the Carbones' operations.

Needing leverage to get Sal off of their backs, Mickey and the Punisher spied on him, and discovered that he was consorting with rival Asian gangsters. Enraged by Sal's treachery, Julius ordered Mickey and the Punisher to dispose of him, so the two drugged Sal and drove him out to New Jersey. Due to his frequent narcotics usage, Sal was able to resist the drugs he was given and tried to flee, but fell through the ice of a frozen lake. Believing Sal to have perished, Mickey and the Punisher left.

Sal survived, and regained consciousness in a hospital, which he escaped from. Recalling nothing about his past other than vague details about the people who had tried to kill him, Sal robbed and murdered a man, and began making his way to La Isla de Tiburones Durmientes, which was where Julius's daughter was about to marry a Sicilian mobster. When a motorist he had flagged down asked him what his name was, Sal, unable to remember, replied with Thorn, a word he had glimpsed on a billboard.

After swimming to La Isla de Tiburones Durmientes, Thorn ran amok, killing his niece's fiancé and Julius, among others. The Punisher put a stop to Thorn's rampage by shooting him repeatedly, and knocking him into the ocean. Thorn recovered, and sometime later murdered a trio of drug dealers for their car, which he drove to New York. Thorn found and attacked Mickey and the Punisher, but the fight was interrupted by the boss of the dealers Thorn had killed. After massacring the head dealer and his underlings, Thorn and the Punisher continued their brawl, which ended when the Punisher threw Thorn off of a bridge, and onto a moving truck. The truck brought Thorn to New Jersey, and he was last seen wandering Newark.

For unexplained reasons, nearly dying in a frigid lake has left Thorn unable to feel pain, allowing him to sustain severe injuries, such as multiple gunshots, without being deterred. Thorn's brush with death has also eliminated his need for basic human necessities such as food, water, air, and protection from the elements, and made him repellent towards animals such as sharks.

In a 2009 interview with Comic Book Resources, illustrator Dale Eaglesham expressed fondness for the character, stating "I spent some time in the Punisher department from 93 to 95 and I really enjoyed working with Frank Castle. However, there's another Punisher-related character that I feel I have unfinished business with: Sal Carbone, the man they call Thorn. He went toe-to-toe with Castle and survived because he thinks he's already dead. He's insane, and he would actually make a great Punisher! Maybe I can talk Ed Brubaker into that one; I think he would love it".

Thorn ranked #4 on The Robot's Voice list "The 8 Worst Punisher Villains Ever".

Thornn

Morlock
Thornn is a fictional mutant, a member of the Morlocks. Created by Rob Liefeld and Fabian Nicieza, the character first appeared in X-Force #6. She is the sister of X-Force member Feral. Thornn's mutation gives her a cat-like appearance (including a prehensile tail), as well as enhanced senses, strength, agility, and healing abilities. When the Morlocks consider forming an alliance with the Brotherhood of Evil Mutants, she helps convince the others to do so. They attempt to capture Feral, but fail miserably. Later, she helps X-Force capture her sister when it is revealed that Feral has killed several of their family members. She later joins X-Corporation and helps save Charles Xavier's life. She is depowered and turned into a baseline human after M-Day,. She is later shown apparently repowered, but it is implied that merely her mutant appearance was returned to her, not her enhanced abilities.

Salem's Seven

Professor Thorton

Thori

Thori was created by Kieron Gillen and Doug Braithwaite and first appeared in Journey into Mystery #632.

When Garm and Hel-Wolf were left together by Kid Loki, they conceived seven Hel pups, with one of them being Thori. While his siblings had inherited their mother's loyal nature, Thori on the other hand had inherited his father's vicious nature. Garm gave the pups to Loki as a gift, since she didn't have time to raise them. However, the All-Mothers, consisting of Freyja, Gaea and Idunn, order Loki to find another home for the pups, so Loki along with Leah left six of the pups with Mephisto, Gaea, Warlock, the New Mutants, Heimdall, Tyr and an Earth animal shelter, leaving Thori the last one. Loki was unable to find a home for the pup, so the All-Mothers ordered him to destroy the pup, since he was beyond salvation. But Loki seeing a bit of himself in the pup, decided to keep him as his pet and named him Thori after his brother Thor.
When Daimon Hellstrom had joined Loki to battle Nightmare, Thori immediately grew fond of Daimon and asked him to be his new master. After the Disir attacked, Thori helped Thor, Loki and the Warriors Three to go to Sigurd and the New Mutants. When Loki was trapped in Muspelheim, Thor tried to lead Hel-Wolf away from Loki, but Thori betrayed them and directed his father to Loki. After the events of Everything Burns storyline, where the Aesir battled the Vanir, Thori remained with his father.

When Angela came to Hel in order to get the soul her love, Sera, and control of Hel, Thori aided Hela, Hel-Wolf and the Disir in the battle, however, he got trapped by Sera. After Angela was successful in the battle, she resurrected Sera and along with Leah, an alternate version of Hela, brought Thori to Brooklyn. After the defeat of the Faustian Queen, an alternate version of Angela, Leah took Thori and left New York.

At some point, Thori was captured by the Collector as part of his museum. When Odinson tried to retrieve the Ultimate Thor's Mjolnir, he came across Thori who managed to escape alongside Odinson and stayed at his side afterwards.

Thousand
Carl King debuted in Spider-Man's Tangled Web #1 (June 2001) and created by Garth Ennis and John McCrea. He is a bully to Peter Parker / Spider-Man that turned into a hive of spiders called the Thousand. Jealous of Parker, King ate the radioactive spider which caused his body to break down into a hive mind of spiders, consuming various men and women then taking control of his victims' remains while getting stronger. King decided to attack Spider-Man to possess the latter's abilities but his former bullying victim defeated him and he accidentally hit an energy box which killed many of his spiders; only one survived but gets stepped on by an unaware citizen.

Threnody

Thunderball

Thunderbird

John Proudstar

Neal Shaara

Thunderbolt

William Carver

Luis Barrett

Thunderclap

Thunderer

Thunderstrike

Eric Masterson

Kevin Masterson

Thundersword

Thundra

Tiboro
Tiboro is a humanoid being from the so-called "Sixth Dimension" who ruled a tribe of Earth humans in South America ages ago, but was eventually banished. He now waits for Earth's civilization to fall into decadence and decay so that he can rule the whole planet. Most of Tiboro's power is contained in his wand, but he can also exercise formidable magical abilities without such artificial aids. Tiboro has become a minor nemesis of Doctor Strange in modern times. Tiboro uses an artifact called the Screaming Idol to communicate with creatures on Earth while he is in his own dimension.

During the "Death of Doctor Strange" storyline, Tiboro has claimed his ancient territory in Peru. Clea later mentioned to Classic Doctor Strange and those present that Tiboro and the other inter-dimensional warlords are fleeing from the Three Mothers.

Tick-Tock
Tick-Tock is a fictional mutant created by Ann Nocenti and Brian Postman. He first appeared in Spider-Woman #50, where he helps the Locksmith capture and imprison various San Francisco-based superheroes and supervillains, including Spider-Woman. He uses his precognitive abilities to help prevent break-outs, anticipating the prisoners' attempts before they could happen, but does not foresee that when Spider-Woman breaks out, she would change costumes with the Gypsy Moth. Placing the two women in each other's cells, Spider-Woman is able to escape and free the others, and the Locksmith and Tick-Tock were sent to prison.

Tick-Tock later joins the Shroud's Night Shift, and assisted in their assault upon the Power Broker alongside Captain America (pretending to be hypnotized by Dansen Macabre). Tick-Tock was instrumental in getting them past the guards at the gate by predicting their movements. Tick-Tock helped Captain America and the Shroud guard the prisoners they took inside the Power Broker's mansion, and ultimately escaped with the Night Shift, evading the authorities.

Later, Tick-Tock joined the Night Shift to observe the Moon Knight's battle with the Shroud, as the Shroud tested him to serve as his replacement in the Night Shift.

After Digger was arrested by the Mockingbird, Tick-Tock joined the Night Shift in attacking the Avengers Compound, unaware that the Mockingbird was no longer an Avenger. Tick-Tock helped the Brothers Grimm defeat the Vision by predicting when he would become solid, but the team was finally defeated by the Avengers. They were then rescued by the Shroud.

When the Hangman assumed control of the Night Shift, he encouraged each member to join him in a campaign of terror against Hollywood, pointing to their backgrounds for reasons why they should hate Hollywood. He noted that Tick-Tock had wanted to be a timer in an animation studio once. Tick-Tock joined the Night Shift in receiving new power from Satannish, but lost a portion of their souls as a result. He accompanied the Night Shift as they captured Hawkeye, the second Spider-Woman, and the U.S. Agent, then attempted to offer their souls to Satannish. Iron Man and the Living Lightning followed Digger to the Tower of Shadows, and saved their teammates from the Night Shift. Tick-Tock attempted to defeat them with his new powers, slowing the Avengers down, but Spider-Woman was outside his path, and knocked him out from behind. They were teleported away from the Avengers by Dansen Macabre. Tick-Tock then joined the Night Shift in an attack on Wonder Man, but found that Wonder Man was immune to his powers, possibly because of his ionic energies. After capturing Wonder Man, they were convinced by him to allow him to join them in their campaign against Hollywood by making their own film.

When the U.S. Agent assumed the part Wonder Man had been playing in "The Demon That Devoured Hollywood", the Night Shift attacked him, and Tick-Tock slowed him down long enough for the Misfit, Digger and the Hangman to knock him out. Realizing that Wonder Man intended to betray them, they also brought Wonder Man down. As the Night Shift continued with their film project, the Avengers attacked them, all on film. The Night Shift nearly defeated them, but then learned from Dr. Strange that they had lost part of their souls to Satannish. They then turned on the Hangman, and helped the Avengers and Doctor Strange drive Satannish back to his own realm.

Tick-Tock was with the Night Shift at the time when they are hired by the crime lord Snapdragon on Count Nefaria's behalf to capture Moon Knight. When the Moon Knight refused Tick-Tock's offer to accompany them, the Night Shift attacked, where Tick-Tock accidentally hit the Tatterdemalion when trying to shoot Maya Lopez. After Echo knocked out Digger, she used a shovel to stab Tick-Tock. Moon Knight and Echo defeated the Night Shift, who are then arrested by the police. As Tick-Tock was being interrogated by the LAPD's Detective Hall, Count Nefaria's lawyer showed up and ended the interrogation. After Count Nefaria's lawyer states that the Night Shift are victims of a beating from vigilantes, the Night Shift are released from police custody. When Tick-Tock and the rest of the Night Shift are brought before Snapdragon and Count Nefaria, the two of them wanted to discuss with them why they failed their mission, where Count Nefaria insulted them for their incompetence. Before the Night Shift could answer, Count Nefaria used his ionic energy blasts to incinerate them, as he tells Snapdragon to aim a little higher the next time she asks for outside help.

Tick-Tock can perceive various possible futures diverging within the next 60 seconds. The sharper his focus on a particular future event, the more likely it is to occur. He uses a pocket watch to focus his power.

After being empowered by Satannish, Tick-Tock could also control the flow of time, causing others to freeze in place, while he and his associates moved normally.

Tiger Shark

Tigra

Tim Boo Ba

Timberius

Timebroker

Timeslip

Tin Man
Tin Man is an alias used by minor characters appearing in American comic books published by Marvel Comics.

Robert Dolan
Robert Dolan, created by Joe R. Lansdale and Byron Penaranda, and first appeared in Amazing Fantasy (vol. 2) #20 (June 2006), was the Sheriff in the Old West town where his inventor father lived in. He arrested local thug Jake Rutherford but he was attacked, maimed and beaten nearly to death by the man's brothers. Dolan is saved though by turned into a steam-powered cyborg thanks to his father who also provided the steam-powered robot horse Tin. Dolan apprehended the Rutherfords and announced to the town that he would continue on as the Steam Sheriff.

Owen Backes
Owen Backes, created by Seth Peck, Jefte Palo and Guillermo Mogorron, and first appeared in X-Men (vol. 3) #40 (January 2013), is a mutant with technopathic abilities. After surviving a car accident which killed his girlfriend Maddie, his crude cyborg-like form protected him from the police before both the X-Men and the Freedom Force arrived to take him, before Backes reluctantly chooses the Freedom Force to help with his powers and provide a chance to help the US government. However, Backes is subsequently a student of the Hellfire Club's Hellfire Academy (a direct opponent for the Jean Grey School for Higher Learning) led by Kade Kilgore to recruit mutants to train to be supervillains for profit. Owen's mutant ability is to assimilate any technological objects into his body and make one with him while allowing him to interface with technology.

Tinkerer

Tippy-Toe

Tippy-Toe is a fictional squirrel appearing in American comic books published by Marvel Comics. The character, created by Dan Slott, first appeared in G.L.A. #4 (September 2005).

Fictional character biography 
After Monkey Joe's death by Leather Boy,Squirrel Girl chose a new squirrel to act as her companion. She considered her Monkey Joe 2 before settling on Tippy-Toe and giving her a pink ribbon. She recruited an army of local squirrels to aid the Great Lakes Avengers in battling Maelstrom and Batroc's Brigade. All of the squirrels died except for Tippy-Toe, who became Squirrel Girl's new permanent partner.

Tippy-Toe assisted Squirrel Girl on several adventures including defeating M.O.D.O.K. when she scratched his face and disabled his Doomsday Chair and disarming Thanos. Because he failed to collect the soul of Monkey Joe, Deathurge was left trapped in the form of a squirrel for months. To escape his squirrel form, Deathurge offered to murder Tippy-Toe and bring her soul to Oblivion. However, this proved to be more difficult then Deathurge planned because Tippy-Toe continually evaded his traps.

When Speedball visited the University of Wisconsin, Squirrel Girl went to meet him but instead, she ended up fighting Bug-Eyed Voice who tried to attack Speedball. Fortunately, Tippy-Toe contacted Speedball's manager and had him meet Squirrel Girl at the GLX headquarters.

During a visit to New York City, Squirrel Girl and Tippy-Toe helped The Thing defeat Bi-Beast in Central Park.

When Squirrel Girl decided to leave the G.L.A. and return to New York City, Tippy-Toe moved with her.With Doreen enrolled as a computer science student at Empire State University, Tippy-Toe continued to aid Squirrel Girl in her superheroics.Tippy-Toe accompanied Squirrel Girl to the moon to confront Galactus and also visited Nutopia XXIV with them.

Although Tippy-Toe was Squirrel Girl's partner, she also continued to have her own adventures. During Squirrel Girl's adventure with Howard the Duck, Tippy-Toe was on vacation.Once, while Squirrel Girl was studying, Tippy-Toe teamed up with Rocket Raccoon to save Central Park from Plantman.Tippy-Toe refused to side with Squirrel Girl's evil clone when she wanted to rid the world of humans. Later, she nearly sacrificed her life to save Doreen when she was sent to the Moon by Allene.

During a Halloween party costume contest M.C.'d by Squirrel Girl, Leather Boy, the murderer of Monkey Joe, showed up. Leather Boy, still thirsty for revenge against Squirrel Girl for joining the G.L.A., tried to kill Tippy-Toe. Fortunately, Deadpool was also in attendance and saved Tippy. Later, Deadpool left Leather Boy tied up in a tree to be attacked by squirrels.

Searching from a way to defeat Galactus, the Chtty and the Chrrt-chuks abducted Tippy-Toe (and Nancy Whitehead by mistake) and placed into a simulation to trick them into revealing the secrets of Galactus's defeat.It was discovered that Chrrt-chuks were actually being extorted by a fake Silver Surfer.Gaining a small portion of the Power Cosmic, Tippy-Toe tried to punish the grifters, but when she was outwitted, she gave the Power Cosmic to Nancy instead.

Tippy-Toe in other media
 Tippy-Toe appears alongside Monkey Joe as Squirrel Girl's sidekick in Ultimate Spider-Man.
 Tippy-Toe appears in Marvel Rising, with her vocal effects provided by Dee Bradley Baker.

Titan

Titan is a size-shifting warrior serving in the Royal Elite of the Shi'ar Imperial Guard, a multi-ethnic group of super-powered alien beings who act as enforcers of the laws of the Shi'ar Empire. Created by Chris Claremont and Dave Cockrum, the character first appeared in X-Men #107 (October 1977). Titan and expand his body to giant size, and has superhuman strength and mass. (Like many original members of the Imperial Guard, Titan is the analog of a character from DC Comics' Legion of Super-Heroes: in his case Colossal Boy.)

Titan was amongst the first of the Imperial Guard encountered by the team of superhuman mutants known as the X-Men who sought to rescue the Princess Lilandra from her insane brother emperor D'Ken. Following the orders of their emperor, the Guard clashed with the X-Men on a nameless Shi'ar Empire planet, and were on the verge of winning when the band of interstellar freebooters known as the Starjammers arrived to turn the tide of battle in the X-Men's favor.

Some time later, when Deathbird was empress, Titan joined the other Imperial Guard members in battle against Excalibur and the Starjammers. Titan fought Captain Britain. Later, on Deathbird's behalf, Titan assisted the other Imperial Guardsmen in battle against the X-Men and Starjammers, but was defeated by them.

Later, after Lilandra became leader of the Shi'ar Empire, Titan was amongst a small group of Imperial Guard that defended their Empress Lilandra against the Kree super-team known as Starforce, during the war between the Shi'ar and Kree Empires. Titan battled the Supremor android. Titan also joined in the Imperial Guard's battle with the Avengers on the Shi'ar throne world of Chandilar during the Kree-Shi'ar War, but was defeated by the Scarlet Witch.

Ronan the Accuser subsequently led the Kree in a surprise attack against the Shi'ar, using the Inhumans as an army to disrupt the Shi'ar control of the Kree. Appearing over the city of Attilan, Ronan seized control in a surprise attack and forces the Inhumans and their king, Black Bolt, to obey, or he would destroy their only home and everyone in it. He compelled Karnak, Gorgon, and Triton to covertly join the Imperial Guard, while Black Bolt and Medusa attempted the assassination of the Shi'ar ruler Lilandra at a ceremony ratifying an alliance between the Shi'ar and the Spartoi. Black Bolt managed to defeat Ronan in personal combat; the attempt on Lilandra's life failed because the shapeshifting Imperial Guardsman Hobgoblin died in her place.

In the battle against Vulcan, Titan seemed to have been killed, but was actually only seriously wounded and later reappears.

Titan was among the Imperial Guardsmen who attacked the Kree homeworld in "War of Kings." During the assault, Hussar and Electron fought Ronan the Accuser, who was ultimately defeated by Titan.

The "Realm of Kings" crossover series sees the Shi'ar team up with the Starjammers to investigate "The Fault," a space-time anomaly that not only threatens Shi'ar space, but all of reality. This crisis leads to Titan's actual death (along with Starbolt, Black Light, and Neutron).

A new Titan is recruited from the ranks of the Subguardians and joins the Imperial Guard on a number of subsequent missions, told in such storylines as "Infinity," the "Trial of Jean Grey," "Time Runs Out," and the return of Thanos.

Titania

Mary McPherran

Davida DaVito

Titanium Man

Boris Bullski

Kondrati Topolov

Andy Bromwell

Others

Titannus

Toad

Tom Thumb
Tom Thumb (Thomas Thompson) is a member of the superhero team the Squadron Supreme. Created by Roy Thomas and John Buscema, he first appeared in The Avengers #85 (February 1971). He is a dwarf scientist and inventor. He designed the Squadron's headquarters and frequently created advanced devices such as a Behavior Modifying Machine that could be used on criminals to change their ways, and a force field belt that protected its wearer.

The character first appears when several members of the Avengers end up in the Squadron Supreme's universe and battle them. The Squadron later are manipulated by the Serpent Cartel, and the team travels to the mainstream Marvel Universe to extend the Cartel's power. They battle the Avengers once more, returning to their own universe in the process, but eventually realize that the Cartel is evil and renounce them.

Alongside the other Squadron members, Thumb is mind-controlled by the Over-Mind and is used in the entity's conquest of the Squadron's Earth. The team is freed by the Defenders, and together they battle and defeat the Over-Mind and Null, the Living Darkness.

To help restore the world after the chaos brought upon it by the Over-Mind's conquest, the Squadron resolves to take control of the planet, and the members reveal their secret identities to the world. Fellow Squadron member Nuke asks Thumb to find a cure for his parents' cancer, but Tom Thumb fails. Thumb discovers that he has also developed terminal cancer. Tom Thumb then completed the Behavior Modification Machine. He was captured by the Institute of Evil, and voted to expel the Golden Archer from the Squadron. Tom Thumb travels to the future to steal a universal cure for disease, but he discovers it is ineffective to cure his cancer. Thumb ultimately dies at the team's headquarters in Squadron City and was placed in the Hibernaculum, a form of suspended animation that he invented to preserve the bodies of diseased or recently deceased persons until a remedy could be found for them.

Tom Thumb has an extraordinary genius level of intellect, but no superhuman powers. He is an expert and innovator in a wide range of scientific and technological fields, including computer science, medicine, psychology, force field technology, and spacecraft design. He possesses total recall and great physical dexterity. He is highly skilled at manipulating various weaponry of his own design. He possesses doctorate degrees in mathematics, physics, and electrical engineering. Tom Thumb has access to a variety of technologies that he has designed. He used a one-man flying vehicle that was equipped with various advanced weaponry, including guns firing concussive energy blasts. His inventions included A.I.D.A. (Artificially Intelligent Data Analyzer), a highly advanced computer with a human-like personality and sentience; the Behavior Modification Machine, which could alter the personalities and thinking processes of human powers; the Hibernaculum, a means of storing a human body in suspended animation; and the Transtemporal Somnaprojector, a means of time travel. He also invented and wore a personal force field belt, which projected a protective field of energy about the wearer that could even deflect bullets.

Supreme Power versions
In Supreme Power, Tom Thumb is one of a number of convicts who volunteered to act as test subjects for a military experiment, which caused him to shrink to less than one inch high. He joins the government's Squadron Supreme program, and he enters counseling to deal with the trauma of being trapped in a capsule during one mission. This version of the character apparently died along with the rest of his universe when it collided with another reality.

Heroes Reborn version
In the 2021 "Heroes Reborn" reality, Tom Thumb is a member of the Secret Squadron. This version resembles the original version of Tom Thumb with the size-shifting of the Supreme Power version. During the fight with Siege Society, Tom Thumb was subdued by Hawkeye. Following the fight with the Siege Society, Tom Thumb's arm is in a sling as he, Nighthawk, and Blur mourn the deaths of their fallen comrades Amphibian, Arcanna Jones, Blue Eagle, and Golden Archer.

Tomazooma
Tomazooma is a gigantic robot designed to resemble a Native American deity of the Keewazi people. The Red Star Oil Company built the robot to frighten the Keewazi into giving up their oil-rich land. Tomazooma fought Wyatt Wingfoot and the Fantastic Four, who defeated it.

When next seen, Tomazooma had been rebuilt into a cuckoo clock being used at a Bar With No Name. The Reanimator got his hands on Tomazooma and built it back to its original specifications. When the New Warriors attacked the Reanimator, Nova blew a hole through Tomazooma's chest.

Tombstone

Tonaja

Adrian Toomes

Valeria Toomes

Valeria Toomes is the daughter of Adrian Toomes in Marvel Comics. The character, created by Robert Rodi and John Higgins.

Prior to being the Vulture, Adrian had a daughter named Valeria with Cheryl Toomes. When the family found themselves on the run, Cheryl abandoned Adrian at the grief of Valeria. Years later, Valeria joined S.H.I.E.L.D. under the name Valeria Jessup in the hopes of disconnecting herself from her criminal father. When A.I.M. got a hold of her true identity in an effort to blackmail her, Valeria got in touch with her father to retrieve the Identity Disc, a disc containing the files on every costumed hero and villain and their true names. Valeria posed as Valeria Merrick and hired the Vulture along with Deadpool, Juggernaut, Sandman, Bullseye and Sabretooth. Claiming that she worked for Tristram Silver, Valeria "kills" Sandman to snap everyone in line. Everything went according to plan with the team retaining the disc which ended up going to S.H.I.E.L.D. Valeria has a bittersweet reunion when her father returns to prison while she continues to work at S.H.I.E.L.D. as Jessup.

Valeria Toomes in other media
Elements of Valeria Toomes's character are essentially merged into Liz Allan (Laura Harrier) in Spider-Man: Homecoming (2017).

Topaz

Torgo
Torgo first appeared in Fantastic Four #91 and was created by Stan Lee and Jack Kirby.

Torgo possesses superhuman strength and durability; he is composed of an unknown metal.

Torgo in other media
Torgo appears in the Avengers Assemble episode "Mojo World", voiced by Roger Craig Smith.

Toro

Thomas Raymond

Benito Serrano

Torpedo

Tower

Tower was a mutant  in the Marvel Comics universe. The character, created by Bob Layton and Jackson Guice, first appeared in X-Factor #2 (March 1986). Tower draws on additional extra-dimensional mass to shrink his dimensions or augment his physical size, strength, and density.

Within the context of the stories, Tower fought the original X-Factor as a member of the Alliance of Evil, a group of mutants banded together by Apocalypse. He was killed by the X-Cutioner in The Uncanny X-Men Annual #17.

Tower of Flower

Blake Tower

Toxie Doxie

Toxin

Tracer

Trance

Transonic

Trapster

Peter Petruski

Larry Cyrtiss

Unnamed

Trash

Bolivar Trask

Larry Trask
Larry Trask is a fictional character in Marvel Comics, the mutant son of scientist Bolivar Trask, creator of the Sentinels. The character first appeared in X-Men #57 (June 1969) and was created by Roy Thomas and Neal Adams.

At the age of five, Larry's mutant power of precognition manifested when he predicted the death of his mother. He lost his older sister Tanya soon after, as she was a mutant time-traveler who had become lost in the timestream.

Fearful of the "mutant menace," Bolivar crafted a medallion that would block Larry's powerful visions of the future, as well as erase any memory of them. As his son grew older, Bolivar enlisted Larry's help in the creation of the first wave of Sentinels. Bolivar occasionally removed Larry's medallion so that he could secretly observe and record Larry's predictions about mutants in the future, and Larry accurately predicted the assassination attempt of Senator Robert Kelly.

Larry was skeptical of his father's hatred of mutants, until the night his sister Tanya (now calling herself Madame Sanctity) returned to the past. Tanya hoped to change the future by stopping her father's creation of the Sentinels, but she was thwarted by her friend Rachel Summers. Though Rachel successfully prevented Larry from witnessing the psychic duel that ensued, she could not hide the physical damage caused by the fight. This convinces Larry that dangerous mutants do exist.

Larry Trask later blames the X-Men for his father's death, and used Bolivar's notes to create a new, stronger wave of Sentinels. He was aided in his effort by Federal Judge Robert Chalmers, who was a friend of Bolivar's and knew Larry's secret. Larry Trask created a base for his Sentinels inside the Colorado Rockies, and he ordered the robots to abduct and detain all known mutants. One of these mutants was Alex Summers; Larry gave him a containment suit to control his unstable powers. Chalmers became disillusioned with Larry's plans, and he forcefully removed Larry's medallion, hoping that Larry would cease his attacks on mutants if he learned the truth about his own mutation. This, however, backfired; when a furious Larry gave the order for Sentinels to destroy all mutants, he himself was targeted for annihilation.

The Sentinels are eventually outwitted by Cyclops, and fly into the sun (perceived by them as the source of all mutations) to apparently be destroyed. Meanwhile, Larry has plunged into a state of catatonic shock, and Chalmers puts the medallion back on him to erase the knowledge of what had happened to him.

The Mark II Sentinels later return from space, and abduct the Scarlet Witch as part of an elaborate plan to prevent the birth of future mutants by sterilizing humanity. Larry is abducted by the Scarlet Witch's brother Quicksilver, who remembers Trask from when he and his sister were previously abducted by the Sentinels. Quicksilver removes Larry's medallion, restoring Larry's knowledge of a Sentinel base in Australia. The duo travels to the secret base, and Larry stops the Sentinels by revealing that the lead Sentinel was mutated during its time in space, causing the others to turn on it and destroy it, thus deactivating themselves. One of the Sentinels falls onto Larry and kills him.

Other versions of Larry Trask
In the one-shot special What If...Magneto & Professor X Had Formed the X-Men Together?, Larry Trask is the billionaire leader of Trask Industries. His anti-mutant prejudice leads him to attack Charles Xavier's Good Shepherd Clinic with a fleet of Sentinels. The strike is unsuccessful, but it spurs the formation of the X-Men in that universe. Later, Larry Trask is revealed to be one of the Lords Cardinal of the Hellfire Club (along with Sebastian Shaw, Harry Leland, and Donald Pierce). It is unclear if this version of Larry is aware of his own status as a mutant, or that he is working with mutants as well.
In the alternate universe of Mutant X, Dr. Lawrence Trask has physically bonded with the Sentinel hardware inside his mountain base, becoming a Prime-Sentinel. He is possessed by Madelyne Pryor, who leads his Sentinels in an attack on the heroes of New York City.

Trauma
Trauma, real name Troh-Maw, was the son of Lord Armageddon, the ruler of an extraterrestrial race known as the Troyjans. Trauma came to Earth to collect on a debt from the Pantheon's leader Agamemnon, who had promised the Troyjans one of his descendants in exchange for technology to extend his children's lifespans. Trauma often stormed the Pantheon's headquarters to take Atalanta, who always drew him back. After the Hulk joined the Pantheon, Trauma cornered Atalanta in the Himalayas and confessed his love for her, but was defeated by the Hulk before he could kidnap her. Trauma later abducted Atalanta and brought her to his homeworld, with the Hulk and the Pantheon in pursuit. The Hulk arrived in time to stop the wedding and challenged Trauma to a duel. Their fight ended when Trauma stumbled over a piece of armor and pierced his heart. Before dying, Trauma proved his love to Atalanta by releasing the Pantheon from their debt and begging Lord Armageddon to allow the Pantheon to return to Earth.

Judas Traveller

Lorelei Travis

Roland Treece
Roland Treece is a fictional character appearing in Marvel Comics. Created by David Michelinie and Mark Bagley, the character first appeared in Venom: Lethal Protector #3 (April 1993). He is the CEO of Treece International and a board member of the Life Foundation. Using a park recreation project as a cover, he searched for a lost stockpile of gold buried beneath a park in San Francisco before dealing with interference from Venom. Treece nearly dies fighting Spider-Man and Venom, but is ultimately saved by Eddie Brock. Treece next appears as Carlton Drake's employee who he attempts to kill through an incorrect serum administration but his employer survives. Treece and Orwell Taylor are arrested by federal agents for their part in Drake's illegal projects.

Roland Treece in other media
Roland Treece appears in the 2018 live-action film Venom, portrayed by Scott Haze. This version is the Life Foundation's head of security and Carlton Drake's chief enforcer. After bringing in scientist Dora Skirth, Treece goes after Eddie Brock twice, but is nearly killed by Venom the first time and killed by Anne Weying the second time.

Tremolo

Dilbert Trilby

Tricephalous

Trick Shot/Trickshot

Buck Chisholm

Barney Barton

Triton

Troll

Damian Tryp

Matsu'o Tsurayaba

Tuck
Tuck is the partner of Death's Head from Marvel UK comics. She was created by Dan Abnett and Liam Sharp, and first appeared in Death's Head #3 (February 1993).

Tuck is a Replicated Organic, an artificial human created on a planet called Lionheart. She was illegally created by a "tissue broker", who, fearing the authorities (all higher technology is forbidden), sold her to a brothel. She escaped and eventually joined Death's Head and his group of outlaws, and accompanied him on his complex travels through time and alternate universes.

During an unspecified time she was intentionally infected by a (eventually harmless) strain of the "plague perfection" - a synthetic virus designed to target only replicated humans and cyborgs. The search produced nothing, as there is no cure.

Tuck is a synthetic human, designed to be slightly superior to a normal human in physical abilities. She is skilled in stealth and combat using Medieval weapons. At one point she gains a powerful cosmic artifact called the Sapphire Lotus which boosts her strength and durability to many times greater than normal, and grants her the power to generate large amounts of energy. She later loses all but a small shard of this object, which still boosts her strength fivefold, and increases her athletic abilities and healing rate.

Tumbler

John Keane

John Keane is a costumed criminal acrobat. Intending to test himself against Captain America, he broke into Avengers Mansion. He easily beat Captain America in two separate struggles—although, this turned out to be the Super-Adaptoid, who had taken Captain America's form and lacked his fighting skills. The real Captain America freed himself from the Adaptoid's trap and defeated the Tumbler in combat.

Later, the Tumbler was hired by Quentin Harderman as a part of the Secret Empire's plot to discredit Captain America. The Tumbler robbed a store, and Captain America tried to capture him but the Tumbler escaped. The next day, John Keane in civilian clothes was told to meet Captain America at a charity boxing match; however the Captain recognized Keane and he ran. Captain America knocked Keane down with his shield, and as the two struggled, the first Moonstone shot and killed Keane with a micro laser under orders from Harderman while hiding out of sight. Harderman accused Captain America of murdering the Tumbler as part of the scheme to discredit him.

Michael Keane
It was later revealed that John Keane was using his ill-gotten gains that he had taken as the Tumbler to pay for his mother's living and her home, while his brother Michael was in the army. He had also taken out a million-dollar life insurance policy with the Guardian Life Insurance Policy. When Michael tried to collect on this policy, Guardian Life Insurance Policy refused to pay the claim since John had been killed in an illegal act. Michael trained hard and took on his brother's identity as the Tumbler, getting Captain America's help to expose the insurance company's fraud.

Unnamed man
After receiving the Tumbler gear from Michael Keane, Roderick Kingsley sold it to an unnamed criminal. Tumbler, Ringer, and Steeplejack are shown to be in the services of Roderick Kingsley. They were later ambushed by the Goblin King's servants Menace and Monster (the "Goblin" form of Carlie Cooper).

Tundra
Tundra is a mystical spirit which inhabits an ever-growing mass of Canadian land in gargantuan semi-humanoid form, and is the enemy of the Inuit gods whom he trapped in another dimension. Tundra was the first of the Great Beasts confronted by Alpha Flight. Tundra was summoned through a mystic ritual in which a possessed Richard Easton traced a gigantic human shape in the barren land of Canada's Northwest Territories and then donned a metallic crown that summoned the spirit of Tundra. Easton's corpse animated, the land mimicking the corpse's movement until Tundra rose in the shape of a humanoid mass of earth. According to Shaman, Tundra was supposed to be controlled by the mind of the human who summoned him but because of the weakened state of Richard Easton when summoning Tundra, Tundra's real personality quickly took over. Tundra's powers stem from the land itself. He can summon mosquitoes, hurl boulders from his body, increase his size by absorbing land mass, and is connected to the land so if he is injured, earthquake-style upheavals occur in the surrounding area.

Turbo

Turner D. Century

Tusk

Ted Twaki

Tweedledope

Twilight
Twilight was character created by Marvel Comics for their Marvel 2099 run X-Nation 2099. This short-lived series only lasted six issues before being terminated. In the year 2099, President Doom contacted Cerebra of the X-Men 2099 to let her know about a recent prophecy about a Mutant Messiah. She undertook the task of locating and training possible candidates and bringing them to Halo City, one of which was Twilight.

Little is known about the girl before she arrived at Halo City, but she soon became a part of the teen group X-Nation. It was some time later that Avian decided to mount a mission to recapture Willow in a bid to be the first to find the messiah for himself. He attacked the children and succeeded in capturing Willow again. Wanting to rescue their friend, X-Nation decided to infiltrate the Million Palms facility and save her. At first, Twilight was unwilling to go but after she misheard a conversation between Cerebra and Sister Nicholas where she thought they were going to experiment on the children she agreed. However, their fledgling efforts ended in their capture. They were able to escape, but upon their return home they found that Halo City was devastated.

Their home had been blown up by the Atlantean army and was being flooded. To add insult to injury, Exodus had awoken from another century-long slumber and tried to make X-Nation his Acolytes. They refused and were subsequently beaten, but Twilight was one of the few who implicitly didn't trust Exodus. The rest of the group joined her opinion when Exodus refused to save the human population of Halo City and they refused to be in service to him. Twilight tried to strike down the powerful mutant with her powers, but he was actually able to leave her "sphere of influence" unharmed. He struck back at her, nearly killing her if not for the magical intervention of Mademoiselle Strange. After Clarion sacrificed himself in the battle with Exodus, the rest of the kids were teleported away by Mlle Strange to face their uncertain futures.

They travel to the Savage Land—the last inhabitable place on earth—and begin to form a society there. Twilight travels to Mars with December, Metalsmith, and several others to see if the red planet has any resources that can be used by the colonists. They get attacked by aliens and crash land, but make it to the Ares base. While there, the resident doctor tells them that lately their children had begun to be abducted at night by aliens called the "Takers".

Later that night, Twilight goes missing so December and Metalsmith go looking for her, but are ambushed. Twilight returns on her own later and explains the origin of the Takers and also that the Phalanx were about to invade earth. Not knowing what to do, Twilight decides to stay with the Takers, and Metalsmith stays with her. But neither of them decide to tell this to December, who is left behind on Mars when the couple blasts off with the Takers, who fly towards the Phalanx mother ship. They, alongside the Takers, are successful in boarding the ship, but they meet an untimely fate.

Down on earth, a robot left behind by Mister Fantastic named Franklin—who has had an enigmatic connection to the Phalanx since his creation—realizes that the Phalanx are evil. Downloading several needed programs, Franklin detonates the Phalanx ship with Twilight and Metalsmith still inside.

Twilight was capable of generating a reality warping "sphere of influence" in which she could do many things including: fly, become intangible, teleport herself and others, cause things to burn, shrink, explode, melt, or reform in various ways. She also displayed a latent form of telepathy which Exodus was unable to eavesdrop on, but whether that was one of the reality warping feats or a different mutation is unknown.

Two-Gun Kid

Tyger Tiger

Typeface

Typhon

Tyr

Tyrak

Tyrannus
Tyrannus is a character appearing in American comic books connected to Marvel Comics. The character first appeared in The Incredible Hulk #5 (January 1963), and was created by Stan Lee and Jack Kirby. The character was inspired by Ayesha, the protagonist of H. Rider Haggard's 1887 novel She: A History of Adventure.

In the Roman Empire, Tyrannus claims to be a "sorcerer", but is actually a scientist far ahead of his time. He was exiled by King Arthur and Merlin to Subterranea, a network of caves and tunnels miles beneath the Earth's surface when he tries to conquer Britain. There Tyrannus discovers a race of orange-skinned semi-humanoid Subterraneans who are eager to find in him a new master to serve. He also discovers a pool of liquid which he drinks to maintain his youth through the centuries. The Subterraneans acquaint Tyrannus with examples and records of technology designed by the Deviants who were their original masters. Tyrannus' scientific genius enables him to master and improve upon the Deviants' scientific wonders over the centuries.  Tyrannus becomes Emperor of the Tyrannoid Subterraneans and an aspiring conqueror.

In the modern era, Tyrannus is finally ready to use this technology and the Subterraneans in conquering the surface world. He makes several attempts as well as fighting wars against the forces of a new arrival in Subterranea, the Mole Man.

Tyrannus woos Betty Ross underground and kidnaps her with his Tyrannoids. When the Hulk challenges him, he agrees to give her back on the condition that the Hulk performs a list of nigh-impossible menial tasks. However, eventually the Hulk completes the list and causes a lot of damage in the Kingdom, and Tyrannus is forced to honor his word. Tyrannus is reverted to an old man when the Mole Man captures his "fountain of youth". Tyrannus uses the Hulk as a pawn by teleporting him underground and recapturing the fountain. Banner succeeds in teleporting himself back. Tyrannus forces scientist Ralph Roberts to design a gigantic robot for him to use in his war against the Mole Man, but is defeated by the X-Men. He decides to gain revenge on the Hulk by using advanced technology to temporarily drive him into destructive rampages. He uses the Hulk and the robot Mogul as slaves in his war against the Mole Man. He later secretly allies with Kala against the Mole Man. Tyrannus projects his consciousness into a Subterranean, who attacks New York City but is thwarted by Nova.

In the guise of the aged Des, he became an ally of Prince Rey and the Keeper of the Flame of El Dorado, an immensely powerful cobalt energy "flame" that had been created in the Andes Mountains of South America by the Deviants and had been maintained by the people of the lost city of El Dorado. "Des" then captured the Hulk. "Des" was then restored to his youthfulness, and killed Rey and the Keeper. Tyrannus then merged with the Flame, allowing his consciousness to control the Flame. The Hulk destroys the machinery from which the Flame arises, and the Flame, still infused with Tyrannus's consciousness, is hurled far into outer space.

The Abomination's atomized body later merges with the disembodied mind of Tyrannus. This gestalt being attempts to force Bruce Banner to cure this condition, but the procedure goes wrong, leaving Tyrannus' mind in the Abomination's body and returning Blonsky to a normal human form. Tyrannus briefly operates as the Abomination and attacks Wonder Man, and Hawkeye, until Ghaur and Llyra free Tyrannus from the Abomination's body and restore him to human form; Tyrannus then adopted the guise of Dr. Tyrone. As Dr. Tyrone, he transformed a number of alcoholics and drug addicts into serpent men, and enslaved Spider-Man. Tyrannus then battled Daredevil and Doctor Strange. He attempted to bring Set to Earth, but was attacked by Viper and swallowed by a serpent demon.

Bruce Banner and Skaar later fight Tyrannus when he and the Tyrannoids attack Manhattan. Tyrannus's energy sword reappears in Banner's possession during the funeral for Hercules. He gives the sword to Amadeus Cho when they are forced to battle Nightmare and Phobos.

Later when he tried to acquire Pandora's Box he acquired the help of Betty Ross (the Red She-Hulk) to help him in this endeavor by tricking the Hulk into opening the casing of the powerful artifact by thinking Betty was trapped inside, thus releasing its energies in the process. Later in the same story arc, Red She-Hulk is shown to not only run off with Tyrannus in her Red She-Hulk form but also sleeps with him, although she eventually returns to Hulk after reconciling her rebellious Hulk instincts with her human desires.

Tyrannus was granted superhuman longevity and youth after drinking from the Fountain of Youth in Subterranea; he is dependent on this fountain of youth to maintain his youth and immortality. He possesses various lingering psionic abilities after his merger with the cobalt "Flame of Life" in El Dorado, including telepathy, mind control of others, and the ability to drain the life force of others; these abilities have not been demonstrated in later appearances. He is an extraordinary scientific genius that Bruce Banner has acknowledged as superior to himself, and has achieved mastery of the advanced technology of the Deviants which he found in Subterranea, upon which he has made further advances. Tyrannus has limited mystic knowledge of sorcery.

Tyrannus often uses ancient Roman weaponry (e.g., swords and spears), but also has access to weapons created by Deviant technology, including guns projecting various types of radiation, and other advanced technological weaponry. He has designed other devices based on Deviant technology and his own innovations, which was manufactured by Subterraneans under his supervision. These include teleportation devices, flying vehicles, and gigantic earth-borers.

Tyrant

References

Marvel Comics characters: T, List of